Native Daughters of the Golden West  is an American non-profit organization for women born in California. The organization focuses on the care and preservation of California history. It is the sister organization to the Native Sons of the Golden West.

History

Founding at Pioneer Hall

The organization was founded in Pioneer Hall, a historic building located in Jackson, California. The first meeting took place on September 11, 1886, in the basement of the Hall. The meeting was called by Lilly O. Reichling. Approximately 20 women attended the first meeting.  The hall is a California Historical Landmark. On September 25, 1886, the Order was organized with Reichling serving as Secretary. Tina L. Kane was the first President. They called their meeting space a "Parlor" and the founding group was named Ursula.

Ursula Parlor No. 1

On March 7, 1887, charter officers were declared. Ursula No 1. had thirty-three founding members. Their first logo featured a fawn. They changed it to include the symbols of Minerva: oriflamme and sheaves of wheat. It also had the letters "P.D.F.A." added. Their founding principles were: "Love of Home, Devotion to the Flag of our Country, Veneration of the Pioneers of California, and an Abiding Faith in the Existence of God." These principles remain today. Between March and June 1887, seventeen other Parlors were organized. In July they held their first Grand Parlor in San Francisco, California.

Today

The main San Francisco Parlor is located in a building designed by architect Julia Morgan.

Notable members

 Laura J. Frakes
 Eliza D. Keith, grand president
 Edith Christensen Wilson

Programs

The organization focuses on projects that retain and support the heritage of California. This includes historic restoration of California Missions, the maintaining of the Roster of California Pioneers, scholarships, environmentalism, child welfare, and the development of historic landmarks.

Publications
From 1905 through 1954 the Native Sons and Daughters of the Golden West published The Grizzly Bear.

References

External links
Official website

501(c)(3) organizations
Non-profit organizations based in San Francisco
1886 establishments in California
Organizations established in 1886
Historiography of California
History of Amador County, California
Women's organizations based in the United States
Women in California